Argeu Hortênsio Monjardim was a Brazilian politician.  He was elected vice-president (vice-governor) of the state of Espirito Santo in 1904, and he governed the state for three weeks until the new-elected governor, Henrique da Silva Coutinho, could be inaugurated.

References

Governors of Espírito Santo
Year of birth missing
Year of death missing